Ceriagrion annulatum is a species of damselfly in the family Coenagrionidae. It is found in Cameroon, the Republic of the Congo, the Democratic Republic of the Congo, and possibly Zambia. Its natural habitats are subtropical or tropical moist lowland forests and swamps.

References

Coenagrionidae
Insects described in 1955
Taxonomy articles created by Polbot